Abdulquddus Atiah (born 1 March 1997) is a Saudi Arabian professional footballer who plays as a goalkeeper for Al-Wehda. He represented the Saudi Arabia national football team in the 2017 Gulf Cup of Nations.

Club career
On 26 January 2018, Atiah signed a 6-month contract with Al-Fayha. On 1 February 2020, Atiah signed a four-year contract with Al-Wehda. He made his debut for Al-Wehda on 2 January 2020 by coming bench off the bench against Al-Raed during the King Cup round of 16 match. He made two saves during the shootout helping Al-Wehda reach the quarter-finals. On 29 February 2020, Atiah made his league debut in a 3–2 defeat to Al-Fateh. On 18 October 2020, Atiah joined Al-Adalah on a one-year loan.

During the 2021–22 season, Atiah made 31 appearances helping achieve promotion to the Pro League. On 20 December 2022, Atiah made his first appearance of the 2022–23 season keeping a clean sheet in the 1–0 away win against Damac in the round of 16 of the King Cup.

Career statistics

Club

References

External links
 
 

1997 births
Saudi Arabian footballers
Saudi Arabia international footballers
Living people
Association football goalkeepers
Al-Fayha FC players
Al-Wehda Club (Mecca) players
Al-Adalah FC players
Saudi Professional League players
Saudi First Division League players
Naturalised citizens of Saudi Arabia